The International Intellectual Property Alliance (IIPA) is a coalition of seven trade associations representing American companies that produce copyright-protected material, including computer software, films, television programs, music, books, and journals (electronic and print media). Formed in 1984, it seeks to strengthen international copyright protection and enforcement by working with the U.S. government, foreign governments, and private-sector representatives.

Activities
IIPA works closely with the U.S. Trade Representative in compiling the annual Special 301 reviews of foreign countries that the Office of the U.S. Trade Representative considers to have inadequate protection of intellectual property rights. IIPA was the principal representative of the entertainment industry in assisting the U.S. government in the World Trade Organization (WTO) TRIPS negotiations, the North American Free Trade Agreement (NAFTA) negotiations, and at the Diplomatic Conference leading to the completion in 1996 of the World Intellectual Property Organization (WIPO) "Internet" treaties—i.e., the Copyright Treaty and the Performances and Phonograms Treaty.

IIPA has also worked with the U.S. government in drafting Intellectual Property Rights Chapters of free trade agreements. It participates in policy development in copyright and enforcement issues in  bilateral and regional initiatives such as the Asia Pacific Economic Cooperation (APEC). IIPA participates in trade actions brought under trade laws like the Generalized System of Preferences and other trade preference programs. 

IIPA is a non-governmental organization at WIPO.

Member associations
The seven trade associations that make up the IIPA membership include:
 Association of American Publishers (AAP)
 Business Software Alliance (BSA)
 Entertainment Software Association (ESA)
 Independent Film & Television Alliance (IFTA)
 Motion Picture Association (MPA)
 National Music Publishers' Association (NMPA)
 Recording Industry Association of America (RIAA)

See also 
 Intellectual property organization
 Pharmaceutical Research and Manufacturers of America (PhRMA)
 Special 301 Report
 Notorious markets

References

External links
 

Intellectual property organizations